Surprise Lake is a  lake located  on Vancouver Island north of Brewster Lake and south of Amor Lake.

References

Alberni Valley
Lakes of Vancouver Island
Sayward Land District